Hurricane Bridget of June 1971 was one of the worst hurricanes to strike the Mexican city of Acapulco. It formed on June 14 as a tropical depression, which is a minimal tropical cyclone with winds less than gale force. However, it was soon upgraded to a tropical storm, and Bridget steadily intensified to become a hurricane on June 15. After peaking at Category 2 intensity, it weakened to a tropical storm on June 17, then made landfall in Mexico. Hours later, however, it turned offshore as a tropical depression. Bridget dissipated on June 20 after leaving heavy damage and 17 deaths in the Acapulco area.

Meteorological history

The origins of the hurricane were from a tropical wave that exited the coast of Africa on June 3. Around four days later the system entered the Caribbean Sea, passing over the San Andres islands on June 12. The area of convection, or thunderstorms, spread across Central America. A surface circulation developed offshore El Salvador, and the system formed into a tropical depression on June 14. For much of the summer of 1971, a large pool of anomalously warm water temperatures extended from Central America to the Gulf of California off the Mexican coast, reaching 89.6 °F (32 °C). This allowed for steady intensification as it tracked through the Gulf of Tehuantepec.

Early on June 15, a ship reported winds of 40 mph (65 km/h) and  seas, which prompted the Eastern Pacific Hurricane Center (EPHC) to upgrade the depression to Tropical Storm Bridget. The storm maintained a general northwest track toward the southwest Mexican coastline. It gradually intensified, and satellite images late on June 16 indicated that Bridget attained hurricane status about 55 mi (95 km) southwest of Puerto Ángel, Oaxaca. It quickly intensified as it neared the coast, reaching winds of 100 mph (155 km/h) just southwest of Acapulco coastline before weakening. Bridget paralleled the Mexican coastline just offshore before making landfall at 1200 UTC on June 17, about 100 mi (160 km) southeast of Manzanillo, Colima. The hurricane rapidly weakened over the mountainous terrain, emerging into the Pacific Ocean as a tropical depression after being over land for only a few hours. Bridget turned westward as a weak tropical cyclone, eventually dissipating on June 20 to the south of the Baja California peninsula.

Preparations and impact
While passing to the southwest of Acapulco, Bridget produced heavy rainfall and strong wind gusts reaching 104 mph (167 km/h). The winds damaged or destroyed many roofs across Acapulco, signs, and windows. Strong winds also downed trees and power lines, which left most of Acapulco without electricity. The high tides damaged coastal properties and destroyed 21 boats, including the flagship of the Admiral of the Mexican Navy. Debris-clogged drains caused drainage facilities to exceed their capacities following the heavy rainfall. Overall, the storm killed 17 people in the region, and caused five additional injuries.

Damage in the area around Acapulco was estimated at around 500 million pesos ($40 million USD). This made it the worst hurricane to hit the city in at least 25 years. Where Bridget made its final landfall, no damage reports were available due to the sparse population of the area.

References

See also

Other storms of the same name

Bridget (1971)
Bridget
Bridget (1971)